George Emery Mendenhall (August 13, 1916 – August 5, 2016) was an American Biblical scholar who taught at the University of Michigan's Department of Near Eastern Studies.

Career
Mendenhall graduated from Midland College in Nebraska in 1936, and from Lutheran Theological Seminary at Gettysburg in 1938. Mendenhall was first an ordained Lutheran minister, and during World War II he served as an intelligence officer in the United States Navy. After the war, Mendenhall obtained a Ph.D. in Semitic languages from Johns Hopkins University and began a career in Ancient Near Eastern and Biblical studies as well as related archeology. He was professor at the University of Michigan from 1952 to 1986. The University of Michigan honored Mendenhall by creating the "George E. Mendenhall Professor Emeritus of Ancient and Biblical Studies".

The Tenth Generation proposed that the Ancient Israelite settlement was actually the result of a cultural-religious egalitarian revolution within Canaanite society, rejecting the views it was either a military conquest or a process of peaceful sedentism. It was popular with some New Left scholars in the mid 1970s. Mendenhall died in August 2016, just 8 days short of his 100th birthday.

Partial bibliography
Law and Covenant in Israel and the Ancient Near East Pittsburgh: The Biblical Colloquium, 1955.
The Tenth Generation: The Origins of the Biblical Tradition Johns Hopkins, 1973.
Ancient Israel’s Faith and History: An Introduction to the Bible in Context (Edited by Gary A. Herion) Westminster John Knox Press, 2001.
Our Misunderstood Bible BookSurge Publishing, 2006
The Quest for the Kingdom of God: Studies in Honor of George E. Mendenhall Eisenbrauns, 1983.

References

1916 births
2016 deaths
People from Muscatine, Iowa
Johns Hopkins University alumni
Midland University alumni
University of Michigan faculty